450 Park Avenue (also known as Franklin National Bank Building) is an office building on Park Avenue in Midtown Manhattan in New York City.

450 Park Avenue has a steel skeleton with concrete floors. The exterior is dominated by black granite and glass. The building was designed by Emery Roth & Sons and developed by Peter Sharp. Adjacent to the building is a public plaza, a privately owned public space, with benches.

History 
In June 2002, 450 Park Avenue was purchased by Taconic Investment Partners. That company spent around $13 million on renovating the lobby, replacing the elevators, and redesigning public areas.

This made it the highest price per square foot paid for an office building at the time in the United States. To pay for the building, Somerset Partners signed a $175 million loan. In mid-2008, Somerset Partners also moved its head office to the building.

On October 30, 2010, a brand of the Phillips de Pury auction house opened on the first three floors of 450 Park Avenue. The first auction was held on November 8 of that year. The auction house covers an area of almost .

In February 2014, 450 Park Avenue was sold to Crown Acquisitions and Oxford Properties for $545 million.

Location 
450 Park Avenue is located in Midtown Manhattan on Park Avenue between East 56th Street and East 57th Street.

450 Park Avenue borders two buildings, including  432 Park Avenue to the southwest and a branch of Turbull & Asser to the west.  On the other side of East 57th Street is the Davies Building and on the other side of Park Avenue is 445 Park Avenue. Other striking buildings in the immediate vicinity of 450 Park Avenue are Trump Tower, Four Seasons Hotel New York, Sony Tower, and the General Motors Building.

References

External links 
 
 Emporis - Franklin National Bank Building Accessed on 4 July 2014
 SkyscraperPage.com - Franklin National Bank Building Accessed on 4 July 2014

Emery Roth buildings
Midtown Manhattan
Office buildings completed in 1972
Office buildings in Manhattan
Park Avenue
Skyscraper office buildings in Manhattan